Nagarik is a Nepali-language daily newspaper, published from Kathmandu, Biratnagar, and Nepalgunj of Nepal simultaneously. It is owned by Nepal Republic Media Pvt.Ltd founded by Shova Gyawali

See also
Kantipur
Gorkhapatra

References

External links
Official website

Daily newspapers published in Nepal
2008 establishments in Nepal
Nepali-language newspapers